Kern Park is a  public park in Portland, Oregon's Foster-Powell neighborhood, in the United States.

References

External links

 

1940 establishments in Oregon
Foster-Powell, Portland, Oregon
Parks in Portland, Oregon